The Sonoma Diet (also known as the New Sonoma Diet) is a lifestyle plan that was devised by nutritionist Connie Guttersen, and is a derivation of the Mediterranean diet.

See also 
 List of diets

References

External links 
 Official Sonoma Diet Website
 Best Intermittent Fasting Apps

Diets
Fad diets